Georgi Kamenski (born 3 February 1947) is a Bulgarian former football goalkeeper who played for Bulgaria in the 1970 FIFA World Cup. He also played for Levski Sofia.

Honours

Club 
Levski Sofia
 Bulgarian League (3): 1964–65, 1967–68, 1969–70
 Bulgarian Cup (2): 1969–70, 1970–71

See also
 List of one-club men in association football

References

External links
FIFA profile
Profile at LevskiSofia.info

1947 births
Living people
Bulgarian footballers
Bulgaria international footballers
Association football goalkeepers
PFC Levski Sofia players
1970 FIFA World Cup players
First Professional Football League (Bulgaria) players